Gravel Island  (砂利島|Jarijima) is a small, uninhabited  island, located in the South China Sea. Gravel Island is part of the Spratly Islands. This coral and volcanic island is the smallest islet and the northwesternmost of a small group of three coral atolls. It is claimed by Japan, the People's Republic of China, and the Republic of China (Taiwan). Gravel Island is the only Spratly Island to be claimed by Japan.

Environment 
The island is a flat, fine gravel covered cay, it measures 80m by 40m, and is subject to erosion. It can become partially submerged throughout the year depending largely on the direction of seasonal winds and waves. The northernmost section of the island has some permanent vegetation. There are no fresh water sources on the island.

History 
On 21 March 1863, the French naval dispatch steamer Kien Chan rescued a pair of Japanese sailors marooned on the island. They called the island Jarijima, a Japanese double entendre, meaning gravel and child. The castaways had survived on the island for approximately a year before their return to Japan. Shortly after their rescue The Kien Chan went on to see action at the Shimonoseki Straits resulting in the death of one of the sailors. The sailors left a semi-permanent stone dwelling on the island

Japanese claim 
The island was listed in a survey by the Imperial Japanese Navy as a potential submarine supply depot.

References 

 __. (2002). 絹と光: 知られざる日仏交流100年の歴史 (江戶時代-1950年代) Kinu to hikariō: shirarezaru Nichi-Futsu kōryū 100-nen no rekishi (Edo jidai-1950-nendai). Tokyo: Ashetto Fujin Gahōsha, 2002. ; 

Islands of the South China Sea